The men's +105 kilograms event at the 1998 Asian Games took place on 14 December 1998 at Thunder Dome, Maung Thong Thani Sports Complex.

Results 
Legend
NM — No mark

 Jaber Al-Ajmi of Kuwait originally finished 10th, but was disqualified after he tested positive for nandrolone.

References
 Results

External links
 Weightlifting Database

Weightlifting at the 1998 Asian Games